Ben Bullen is a small mountain village in the Central West of New South Wales, Australia. It is located on the Castlereagh Highway (almost) halfway between the small towns of Cullen Bullen and Capertee. The place name Ben Bullen is derived from the local Aboriginal word meaning "high, quiet place".

The village was formed when the railway was constructed in the early 1880s. While goods trains still use the railway line the small railway station is closed. Since the closure of the railway station a bus service serves the community.

Ben Bullen is surrounded by picturesque cattle grazing land and the Gardens of Stone National Park. Farming and coal mining are the main local employers.

Heritage listings
Ben Bullen has a number of heritage-listed sites, including:
 Wallerawang-Gwabegar railway: Ben Bullen railway station

References

Mining towns in New South Wales
City of Lithgow